Gray Line Australia is an Australian provider of sightseeing tours operating in Sydney, Melbourne, Brisbane, Gold Coast, Sunshine Coast, Cairns, Adelaide, Perth, Alice Springs, Darwin and Tasmania. The Australian franchise is owned by Driver Group and associated with Gray Line Worldwide.

In the early 1990s the Gray Line franchises were issued to various parties, Driver Group gaining Melbourne, Clipper Tours Sydney and Festival Tours Adelaide. Driver Group gradually purchased the other Australian franchises holders and in October 2008 gained control of the Brisbane and Gold Coast franchises giving it 100% ownership of all mainline Gray Line operations.

In November 2013 Driver Group sub-licensed the operation of the Sydney services to Australia Wide Coaches.

References

External links
Showbus gallery

Companies based in Melbourne
Gray Line Worldwide
Travel and holiday companies of Australia